Austral Island is a small Antarctic island in the extreme southern lobe of Penney Bay, in the Windmill Islands. The island appears in air photos taken by USN Operation Highjump (1946–47), but was not charted on subsequent maps. So named by US-ACAN because it is the southernmost of the Windmill Islands.

See also 
 Composite Antarctic Gazetteer
 List of Antarctic and sub-Antarctic islands
 List of Antarctic islands south of 60° S
 SCAR
 Territorial claims in Antarctica

References

Windmill Islands